International System series may refer to:

International K and KB series
International L series
International R series